Throckmorton or the variant spelling Throgmorton may refer to:

Places
Throckmorton, Texas, county seat of Throckmorton County, United States
Throckmorton, Worcestershire, a small village near Pershore, United Kingdom
Throckmorton County, Texas, United States
Throgmorton Street in the City of London

People
 Burton H. Throckmorton Jr. (1921–2009), American New Testament scholar, author of Gospel Parallels
 Calvin Throckmorton (born 1996), American football player
 Clare McLaren-Throckmorton (1935–2017), British barrister and Queen's Counsel
 Clement Throckmorton (died 1573) (c. 1512–1573), English landowner and Member of Parliament
 Clement Throckmorton (MP for Warwickshire), English politician who sat in the House of Commons between 1624 and 1626
 Clement Throckmorton (died 1663) (1630–1663), English politician, Member of the House of Commons variously between 1656 and 1663
 Cleon Throckmorton (1897-1965), American painter, theatrical designer, producer, and architect
 Elizabeth Throckmorton (1565–c. 1647), English courtier, wife of Sir Walter Raleigh
 Francis Throckmorton (1554–1584), nephew of Sir Nicholas and a conspirator against Queen Elizabeth I
 Sir George Throckmorton (bef. 1489–1552), English politician, Member of Parliament
 James Fron Sonny Throckmorton (born 1941), American country music songwriter
 James W. Throckmorton (1825–1894), American politician, Governor of Texas, U.S. Representative, Texas Senator
 Job Throckmorton (1545–1601), English pamphleteer
 General John L. Throckmorton (1913–1986), American general, Deputy Commander, Military Assistance Command, Vietnam, 1964–1965
 Joseph Throckmorton (1800–1872), American steamboat builder
 Sir Nicholas Throckmorton (c. 1515–1571), English diplomat and politician
 Peter Throckmorton (1928–1990), American journalist and underwater archaeologist 
 Robert Throckmorton (1882–1951), American actor
 Sir Robert Throckmorton (1513-1581), English politician, Member of Parliament
 Warren Throckmorton (born 1957), psychologist famous for his work in the area of sexual orientation
 William Edward Throckmorton (1795–1843), pioneer and father of James W. Throckmorton

Characters
 Throckmorton P. Gilder-sleeve, title character in The Great Gildersleeve
 Throckmorton P. Ruddigore, central character in Jack L. Chalker's The Dancing Gods series

Other
 Throckmorton Plot, in English history
 Throckmorton baronets

See also